= Lhasa Comprehensive Pavilion =

Urban pavilion in Lhasa, Tibet, China

Coordinates: 29.65588°N 91.17894°E

Lhasa Comprehensive Pavilion (Chinese: 拉萨市综合展馆) is a large-scale comprehensive urban pavilion in Lhasa, which houses the Lhasa Municipal Archives (Chinese: 拉萨市档案馆), Lhasa Urban Planning Exhibition Hall (Chinese: 拉萨市城市规划展览馆), Lhasa Urban Construction Archives & Press Release Center (Chinese: 拉萨市城建档案馆和新闻发布中心). The pavilion is located in the East District of Lhasa, nearby the Department of Natural Resources of the Tibet Autonomous Region.

== History ==
The museum was constructed with the assistance of Jiangsu Province, with a total investment of 120 million RMB and a construction area of nearly 27,000 square meters. A groundbreaking ceremony for the museum was conducted on May 23, 2010. In 2011, a groundbreaking ceremony was conducted for six projects, including the Lhasa Comprehensive Pavilion, which was constructed with the non-reimbursable assistance of Jiangsu Province.
